Ombella-M'Poko is one of the 16 prefectures of the Central African Republic.  Its capital is Bimbo. One important tourist attraction is the Falls of Baoli; however, due to the Baoli dam, the falls only carry water on the weekends.

Geography 
The prefecture lies in the southwestern part of the country and borders the prefectures of Ouham to the north; Lobaye to the south; Ouham-Pendé, Nana-Mambéré, and Mambéré-Kadéï to the west; and Kémo, as well as the independent city of Bangui and the Democratic Republic of the Congo to the east.

Lake Manuela is also located in this region.

References

 
Prefectures of the Central African Republic